The Liverpool Academy of Arts  was founded in Liverpool in April 1810 as a regional equivalent of the Royal Academy, London. It followed the Liverpool Society of Artists, first founded in 1769, which had a fitful existence until 1794. Two local art collectors, Henry Blundell and William Roscoe were its first Patron and Secretary, the prince regent  George gave his patronage for the next three years, and it was actively promoted by presidents of the Royal Academy.

It had a teaching school and staff included William Spence who served as its Professor of Drawing in the 1840s.

Its membership included local artists such as the landscapists John Rathbone, Richard Ansdell, Thomas Chubbard, Alfred William Hunt and Charles Barber, and the sculptor John Gibson.

Leading artists of the day competed for its prize of £50 for non-local contributors to its annual exhibition, including J. M. W. Turner, Henry Fuseli, John Martin and Joseph Wright of Derby.

In the late 1850s, however, it split due to major disagreements following annual prizes being awarded to the then controversial Pre-Raphaelite painters, particularly to William Holman Hunt in 1852 for Valentine Rescuing Sylvia from Proteus and to Millais in 1857 for The Blind Girl.

The Academy remained nominally in existence, continuing to hold annual exhibitions, but never regaining its national importance.

References

 Liverpool recalls its artistic past, The Times, 10 June 1960

Regional and local learned societies of the United Kingdom
1810 establishments in England
Cultural organisations based in Liverpool
Organizations established in 1810
Arts organizations established in the 1810s